Amery station is a flag stop railway station in Amery, Manitoba, Canada.  The stop is served by Via Rail's Winnipeg – Churchill train.

Amery is the site where the new (existing) line (to Churchill) splits from the old (never completed) line to Port Nelson.

Footnotes 

Via Rail stations in Manitoba